Deadly Possessions was an American paranormal reality television miniseries that aired from April 2, 2016 to May 7, 2016 on the Travel Channel. It featured paranormal investigator Zak Bagans of Ghost Adventures as he gathered artifacts for his new museum in Las Vegas, Nevada. The miniseries researched these items and some of the claims of paranormal activity around them.

Episodes

References

External links

Travel Channel original programming
Paranormal reality television series
2016 American television series debuts
Ghost Adventures